The Stele of Sulaiman is a Yuan Dynasty stele that was erected in 1348 to commemorate the benefactors and donors to a Buddhist temple at the Mogao Caves southeast of Dunhuang in Gansu, China. The principal benefactor is named as Sulaiman, Prince of Xining (died 1351). The stele, which is now held at the Dunhuang Academy, is renowned for an inscription of the Buddhist mantra Om mani padme hum in six different scripts. Another stele, commemorating the restoration of the Huangqing Temple in 1351 by Sulaiman was found at the same location as the 1348 stele.

Discovery
The two steles were first recorded by the French explorer, Charles Eudes Bonin (1865–1929), during an expedition to western China from 1898 to 1900. When Aurel Stein visited Dunhuang in 1900–1901 he found both steles outside a shrine next to Cave 96, the home of a colossal Buddha statue, 35.5 m in height. Stein supposed that the steles originally belonged in the cave of the colossal Buddha, and that the inscription "Cave of Unequalled Height" at the top of the 1348 stele referred to this particular cave rather than the caves in general as is now the case.

The 1348 Stele

The 1348 stele is 140.5 × 61.5 cm in size.  The face of the stele has the words "Cave of Unequalled Height" written in large Chinese characters at the top, below which the Buddhist mantra  is engraved in six different scripts around the engraved image of the four-armed Tibetan form of Avalokiteśvara, the bodhisattva of compassion, with whom this mantra is particularly associated:
 Lanydza, laid out horizontally on the first row;
 Tibetan, laid out horizontally on the second row;
 Old Uyghur, laid out vertically on the far left;
 'Phags-pa, laid out vertically to the left of the image;
 Tangut, laid out vertically to the right of the image;
 Chinese, laid out vertically on the far right.

The layout of these scripts is very similar to the layout of the same six scripts on the inscriptions of dharani on the inner walls of the Cloud Platform at Juyongguan, carved three years earlier in 1345.  However, on the Cloud Platform inscriptions the positions of 'Phags-pa and Old Uyghur are reversed.

On the left, right and bottom of the stele, surrounding the mantras, are inscriptions in smaller Chinese characters, as described:
 
On the righthand side is a list of principal benefactors, headed by Sulaiman and his wife, Küčü (Chinese: Qu Zhu 屈朮), and their children.  Sulaiman was a fourth generation descendant of Temüge, the youngest brother of Genghis Khan, and according to the History of the Yuan Dynasty he was installed as Prince of Xining in 1329.

On the lefthand side it is recorded that the stele was erected on the 15th day of the 5th month of the 8th year of the Zhizheng era [of Emperor Huizong of Yuan] (i.e. 1348) by the monk Shoulang 守朗.

On the far left, outside the frame, is a single line recording that the stele was engraved by a certain Shelan Lingdan.

At the bottom is a long list of other donors, many of them with Mongolian or Tibetan names.

The 1351 Stele

The 1351 stele was erected to commemorate the restoration of the Huangqing Temple by Sulaiman and other benefactors.  The inscription text, composed by Liu Qi, Director of Literary Studies of the Shazhou District, in the 8th month of the 11th year of the Zhizheng era (i.e. 1351) states that Sulaiman donated gold, silk, timber and other provisions for the temple's reconstruction, and that the monk Shoulang, who erected the 1348 stele, was responsible for keeping a register of donors.  The inscription also notes that Sulaiman died when the restoration was completed, and so the principal benefactor listed at the end of the inscription is Sulaiman's son, Yaɣan-Šāh, the new Prince of Xining.

See also
 Mani stone
 Yongning Temple Stele, 1413 stele with Om mani padme hum inscribed in four scripts
 Cloud Platform at Juyongguan, 1345 Buddhist structure with inscriptions in the same six scripts as the Stele of Sulaiman
 Tangut dharani pillars – two 1502 dharani pillars inscribed with the Dharani-sutra of the Victorious Buddha-Crown in Tangut script

Notes

Footnotes

External links
 the Mogao Caves Picture Stele

14th-century inscriptions
Dunhuang
Sulaiman
Tibetan Buddhist art and culture
Tangut script
Tibetan script